Melinka Airport  is an airport serving Melinka, a port town in the Guaitecas Archipelago of the Aysén Region of Chile.

The airport and town are on a small peninsula off Isla Ascensión. North and south approach and departure are over the water.

See also

Transport in Chile
List of airports in Chile

References

External links
OpenStreetMap - Melinka
OurAirports - Melinka
SkyVector - Melinka

Airports in Chile
Airports in Aysén Region
Guaitecas Archipelago